The Louisiana Board of Elementary and Secondary Education (BESE) is an administrative policy-making body for elementary and secondary schools in the U.S. state of Louisiana. It was created in the 1973 Louisiana Constitutional Convention, called by then Governor Edwin W. Edwards, and codified as Article VIII of the resulting document, the 1974 Louisiana Constitution.

Purpose
BESE provides leadership in setting the education agenda for public education with an emphasis on student and school achievement. BESE also pushes for greater funding of public education.

Membership
The BESE consists of eleven total members: eight elected members from the eight BESE districts [based on the former eight congressional districts, since reduced to six] along with three members-at-large appointed by the governor. The elected members serve four-year terms, concurrent with the governor.

In 2007, the board appointed Paul Pastorek, a former BESE member, as the Louisiana state education superintendent upon the death of Cecil J. Picard. Pastorek resigned as superintendent in 2011. In 2012, eight of the eleven members were required to confirm Governor Bobby Jindal's appointment of John C. White as superintendent. White is an advocate of the Common Core State Standards Initiative, which encompasses educational vouchers, charter schools and in-depth teacher evaluations.

Duties
The powers and duties of the State Board can be broadly grouped into six main categories, which include:

 Enacting policies and adopting regulations governing the statewide operations of public and nonpublic elementary and secondary schools, including special schools and entities in Special School District # l;
 Exercising administrative oversight over functions of the state's three special schools (blind, deaf, physically handicapped), and Special School Districts #1 and #2, including personnel, budget, and program operations;
 Administering and serving as the fiscal agent and as program control agent for the Education Quality Trust Fund (8(g) programs;
 Conducting administrative hearings and serving as the "court of last resort" prior to judicial proceedings in cases/controversies deriving from Board actions;
 Exercising budgetary and fiscal control over the educational programs and services at the elementary and secondary (state and federal funds);
 Preparing the MFP and presenting it to the Legislature for approval and distributing funds to local school systems.

Other activities
The Board has other more specifically defined duties assigned to it by law. These include:

 Approval of certification requirements for school personnel, including approval of National Teacher Examination scores for classroom teachers and school administrators;
 Adoption of policies for the assessment and evaluation of teachers/administrators;
 Adoption of policies for the assessment of student performance, including the Graduation Exit Exam (GEE), and policies for remediation of students performing below standard;
 Awarding of diplomas and certificates for successful completion of programs of study;
 Serving as local school Board for the state special schools for blind, deaf, and physically handicapped;
 Coordinating the educational programs in the state correctional institutions and mental health facilities (Special School Districts # 1 and # 2);
 Approval of textbooks, library and reference books purchased with state funds;
 Administration of school food service programs in all schools;
 Adoption of operating standards for public and nonpublic elementary and secondary schools;
 Administer the 8(g) Quality Trust Fund Program;
 Administer the state's Charter Schools Program.

On March 8, 2017, BESE adopted new science standards for elementary and secondary schools, the first updating in twenty years. The standards encompass the Louisiana Science Education Act of 2008, which protects academic freedom  for teachers and students considering scientific subject matter, such as the age of the earth, human cloning, and global climate change. Louisiana State Representative Beryl Amedee, a Republican from Gray in Terrebonne Parish, had taken the lead in petitioning BESE to include the science education act in the formulation of the new standards.

Current membership
Five of the following members currently represent the 8 BESE Districts in Louisiana:
 1st District: James Garvey, Jr. (R) of Metairie, elected in 2011, 2015, and again in 2019 with 60% of the vote.
 2nd District: Kira Orange Jones (D) of Baton Rouge, reelected in 2015, and again in 2019 with 61% of the vote.
 3rd District: Sandy Holloway (R) of Thibodaux, was re-elected in 2019 with 77% of the vote. She replaced Lottie Beebe of Breaux Bridge, whom she unseated in 2015.
 4th District: Tony Davis (R) of Natchitoches He was re-elected in 2019 without opposition.
 5th District: Ashley Ellis (R) of  Monroe was elected in 2019 with 62% of the vote.
 6th District: Ronnie Morris (R) of Baton Rouge was elected in 2019 with 72% of the vote in a November run-off election against Gregory Spiers (R) of Springfield, La. Morris replaced Katy Edmonston (R) who opted to run for the House of Representatives and was elected to House District 88 in the same November run-off election. Edmonston succeeded Chas Roemer, or Charles Elson Roemer, IV (R) of Baton Rouge (son of former Governor Buddy Roemer and grandson of Charles E. Roemer, II, Louisiana commissioner of administration from 1972 to 1980). Roemer did not seek reelection.
 7th District: Holly Franks Boffy (R) of Lafayette, elected in 2011, 2015 and 2019 with 62% of the vote.
 8th District: Preston Castille (D) of Baton Rouge was elected in 2019 with 52% of the vote. He replaced Jada Lewis (D) of Baton Rouge, elected in 2015, who opted not to seek re-election.

The following members were appointed (or re-appointed) in January 2020 by Governor John Bel Edwards:
Thomas Roque (re-appointed) 
 Doris Voitier (re-appointed)
Dr. Belinda Creel Davis (newly appointed)
 
Most of the members were elected with "heavy investment and support" by the interest group, the Louisiana Federation for Children. A nine-member board majority has supported school vouchers and charter schools.

See also

 Louisiana Department of Education

References

Education in Louisiana
Government of Louisiana